Raise the Alarm is the debut album by British indie band The Sunshine Underground, released 28 August 2006. NME described the album as the "first great album of the new rave movement" which included the Klaxons and Shitdisco.

Track listing
All songs written by Craig Wellington, Stuart Jones & Matthew Gwilt
"Wake Up" – 2:31
"Put You in Your Place" – 3:14
"Dead Scene" – 3:55
"The Way It Is" – 5:14
"Commercial Breakdown" – 3:50
"Somebody's Always Getting in the Way" – 3:00
"Borders" – 4:02
"Panic Attack" – 3:44
"I Ain't Losing Any Sleep" – 4:19
"My Army" – 4:09
"Raise the Alarm" - 5:15
"Climbing the Walls" (hidden track on the CD edition) – 3:37

2006 debut albums
The Sunshine Underground albums